Patrick Iteka (born 23 May 1938, died 22 Aug 1993) was a Tanzanian clergyman and bishop for the Roman Catholic Diocese of Mahenge. He was appointed bishop in 1973. He died in 1993.

References 

1993 deaths
Roman Catholic bishops of Mahenge
1938 births
Tanzanian Roman Catholic bishops